Ismail Ahmed Ismail (born 1 November 1984) is a Sudanese sprinter who represents Sudan in 800 metres. He was born in Khartoum. Ismail reached the final in that event at the 2004 Summer Olympics in Athens.

Achievements

Personal bests
 800 metres – 1:43.82 min (2009)
 1500 metres – 3:41.97 min (2005)

References

External links  
 
 
 

1984 births
Living people
People from Khartoum
People from Darfur
Sudanese male middle-distance runners
Athletes (track and field) at the 2004 Summer Olympics
Athletes (track and field) at the 2008 Summer Olympics
Athletes (track and field) at the 2012 Summer Olympics
Athletes (track and field) at the 2015 African Games
Olympic athletes of Sudan
Olympic silver medalists for Sudan
World Athletics Championships athletes for Sudan
Medalists at the 2008 Summer Olympics
Olympic silver medalists in athletics (track and field)
African Games competitors for Sudan
Islamic Solidarity Games competitors for Sudan
Islamic Solidarity Games medalists in athletics